is a Japanese manga series written and illustrated by Niwa Tanaba. It was serialized in Shogakukan's seinen manga magazine Weekly Big Comic Spirits from August 2014 to May 2020.

Media

Manga
Tokusatsu Gagaga is written and illustrated by Niwa Tanaba. It was serialized in Shogakukan's seinen manga magazine Weekly Big Comic Spirits from August 11, 2014 to May 11, 2020. Shogakukan collected its chapters in twenty tankōbon volumes, released from November 28, 2014 to August 28, 2020.

Volume list

Drama
A 7-episode Japanese television drama series adaptation, starring Fuka Koshiba as Kano Nakamura, was broadcast on NHK General TV from January 18 to March 1, 2019.<ref></p></ref>

Reception
Tokusatsu Gagaga ranked #17 on Takarajimasha's Kono Manga ga Sugoi! guidebook list of 2016 top manga series for male readers. Tokusatsu Gagaga ranked #15 on the "Nationwide Bookstore Employees' Recommended Comics" by the Honya Club website in 2016. The manga was nominated for the 21st Tezuka Osamu Cultural Prize in 2017. In 2019, on Da Vinci'''s magazine 18th annual "Book of the Year" list, Tokusatsu Gagaga'' ranked #29.

References

External links
 
 

Comedy anime and manga
NHK television dramas
Shogakukan manga
Seinen manga